SGT may refer to

 Sergeant, a rank in many uniformed organizations
 Scotland's Great Trails
 Singapore Standard Time or Singapore Time
 Society of Glass Technology